Paul Cook is an English former professional rugby league footballer who played in the 1990s and 2000s, and coached in the 2000s and 2010s.

Cook won caps for England while at Leeds in the 1995 Rugby League World Cup against Fiji (sub), and South Africa. He played for the Bradford Bulls on the wing in the 1996 Challenge Cup Final, scoring a try and kicking six goals in their defeat by St. Helens.

References

External links
(archived by web.archive.org) World Cup 1995 details
Cook extends contract with Giants
Rugby League: Cook the latest to join Giants
Rugby League: Halifax take advantage of Cook's error
 Match Report: Bramley Buffaloes 40 V Dewsbury Celtic 16, Bramley Today
Photograph 'Cookie' at rlhp.co.uk

1976 births
Living people
Place of birth missing (living people)
Bradford Bulls players
Bramley Buffaloes coaches
Doncaster R.L.F.C. players
England national rugby league team players
English rugby league coaches
English rugby league players
Huddersfield Giants players
Hunslet R.L.F.C. players
Leeds Rhinos players
Rugby league centres
Rugby league five-eighths
Rugby league fullbacks
Rugby league wingers
Widnes Vikings players
Workington Town players